The 2011 Iowa State Cyclones football team represented Iowa State University in the 2011 NCAA Division I FBS football season. The Cyclones were led by third year head coach Paul Rhoads and play their home games at Jack Trice Stadium. They are a member of the Big 12 Conference. The conference play began with a loss at home to the Texas Longhorns, and ended with a loss at Manhattan, Kansas to the Kansas State Wildcats in the Farmageddon series, with a 3–6 record. The season will likely be remembered for the game against then #2 Oklahoma State Cowboys, who the Cyclones upset in a double-overtime thriller throwing the BCS into "utter chaos" as dubbed by sports media. The Iowa State squad was invited to the first Pinstripe Bowl game, which they were defeated by Rutgers, and the Cyclone's 2011 season came to a close with 6–7 overall record, 3–6 in Big 12 play, finished 8th place.

Personnel

Coaching staff

Schedule

Game summaries

Game 1: vs. Northern Iowa Panthers

Game 2: vs. Iowa Hawkeyes

Game 3: at Connecticut Huskies

Game 4: vs. Texas Longhorns

Game 5: at Baylor Bears

Game 6: at Missouri Tigers

Game 7: vs. Texas A&M Aggies

Game 8: at Texas Tech Red Raiders

Game 9: vs. Kansas Jayhawks

Game 10: vs. Oklahoma State Cowboys

Game 11: at Oklahoma Sooners

Game 12: at Kansas State Wildcats

Game 13: vs Rutgers Scarlet Knights

References

Iowa State
Iowa State Cyclones football seasons
Iowa State Cyclones football